The Basilica Cathedral of Arequipa ("Basílica Catedral", in Spanish) is located in the "Plaza de Armas" of the city of Arequipa, province of Arequipa, Peru. It is the most important Catholic church of the city and also of the larger Roman Catholic Archdiocese of Arequipa since it is the base of the archbishop and the metropolitan council. The cathedral is also considered one of Peru's most unusual and famous colonial cathedrals since the Spanish conquest.

Timeline
August 15, 1540: This is the date in which the city was founded by Garcí Manuel de Carbajal. The cathedral started construction on this very date. In the "Act of Foundation" of Arequipa, it can be read: "...in the name of its majesty Governor Francisco Pizarro, founded the beautiful village in the valley of Arequipa, in the Collasuyo section, above the river edge, in his name he put the cross, in the location signaled for the Church; He put the pike in the Plaza of the village, which he stated would do in the name of its majesty..."

February 14, 1544: The representatives of the Council, Justice and Directorate of the city signed a contract with the architect Pedro Godínez, then regent of the city and commander of San Juan Bautista de Characato, and the carpenters Juan Rodríguez and Gregorio Álvarez to build the church.

September 1544: Miguel Cornejo, the mayor of the city, assigned the building of the portal to the master Toribio de Alcaraz, who agreed to build it using white petrified volcanic lava (sillar). The church is built with two main sections.

January 22, 1583: An earthquake reduced the church to rubble.

1590: It is decided to rebuild again the main church, and this is assigned to Gaspar Báez, who is helped by several Spanish officials and many hundreds of "Mitayo" Indians. The new design would have three sections, arcs and vaults of brick.  

February 1600: When construction was almost finished, the violent eruption of the Huaynaputina stratovolcano (also known as Quinistaquillas or Omate), together with several earthquakes and a rain of ash, destroyed part of the structure.

1604: Another earthquake completely destroyed what was remaining of the structure.

1609: The Bula of Pope Paul V created the Arequipa Diocese, separating it from the one in Cuzco. The Arequipan Catholics had become impoverished since the Volcano eruption, but decided to rebuild the cathedral.

January 27, 1621: Mr. Andrés de Espinoza was assigned the construction of the cathedral.

1628: Espinoza died.

1656: The construction of the cathedral was finished. It had three sections, 180 feet long by 84 feet wide (84.86 m by 25.6 m), 8 pillars, 5 chapels, 22 arcs, 15 brick vaults.

1666: Earthquake. Some damage, but no structural damage. Partially reconstruction of the facade started immediately.

1668: Earthquake. Some damage, but no structural damage. Partially reconstruction of the facade started immediately.

1687: Earthquake. Some damage, but no structural damage. Partially reconstruction of the facade started immediately.

1784: Earthquake. Some damage, but no structural damage. Partially reconstruction of the facade started immediately.

December 1, 1844: There was a fire in the cathedral. The fire destroyed several parts of the church and many paintings, sculptures and furniture pieces, as well as several vaults and pillars.

December 15, 1844: Present reconstruction work was made, under the direction of the Bishop José Sebastián de Goyeneche y Barreda, and his brother Juan Mariano de Goyeneche. Technical direction was under the architect Lucas Pobrete. In this restoration it was enlarged reaching the place of the old San Juan church (destroyed in 1784).

1850: The Bishop Goyeneche assigned the production of several jewelry pieces to adorn the cathedral to the Spanish jeweler Francisco de Moratilla, who was then jeweler of the Queen of Spain. The nephews of the bishop (the count of Guaqui, the duchesses of Goyeneche and Gamio and Jose Sebastian de Goyeneche) gave the cathedral the main altar (still exists today) which was installed by an Italian architect of last name Guido.

1854: The clock of the tower, made in England, was installed. Also the music organ and twelve giant wood sculptures, all made in Belgium, of the apostles.

1879: The pulpit, made at the shop of Buisine-Rigot in Lille, France, was installed thanks to the Peruvian ambassador in France, Mr. Juan Mariano de Goyeneche, count of Guaqui. It was given to the church by Javiera Lizárraga de Alvarez Comparet. 

August 13, 1868: A violent and long earthquake destroyed several parts of the cathedral: the towers, part of the main portal, some of the facade arcs, and some altars. In the following years, thanks to the Bishop and the Goyeneche family and under the technical direction of Lucas Pobrete, the two towers and the facade arcs were rebuilt.

June 23, 2001: The 2001 southern Peru earthquake measuring 8.1 on the Richter scale on June 23. The left tower was destroyed, and the right tower suffered major damage. 

August 15, 2002: On the anniversary of its foundation, Mayor Manuel Guillén finished the restoration of the towers.

See also
 List of colonial buildings in Arequipa

Related Sites
 Catedral de Arequipa

Roman Catholic churches in Arequipa
Roman Catholic cathedrals in Peru
Roman Catholic churches completed in 1656
Arequipa
Tourist attractions in Arequipa Region
1656 establishments in the Spanish Empire
Renaissance architecture in Peru
17th-century Roman Catholic church buildings in Peru